Brian Piesner is a retired American soccer midfielder who played professionally in Major League Soccer and the USISL A-League.

Piesner spent most of his early life on Long Island, New York.  When he was fourteen, his family moved to Spring, Texas where he played youth soccer with the Texans Soccer Club – Houston.  His family moved to Southern California in 1994 where he attended Santa Margarita Catholic High School.  He played on the Santa Margarita boys' team, graduating in 1996. He attended Rutgers University, where he played on the men's soccer team from 1996 to 1999.  During the 1999 collegiate off season, Piesner played for the Central Jersey Riptide of the USL Premier Development League.  On February 6, 2000, the Dallas Burn chose Piesner in the fourth round (forty-sixth overall) of the 2000 MLS SuperDraft.  That year, the Atlanta Silverbacks selected Piesner in the first round (twenty-second overall) of the A-League draft.  Piesner signed with the Burn but was released him on February 24 and he signed with the Silverbacks.  On December 19, 2001, the Battery signed Pierson to a three-year contract.  The Battery released him before the 2002 season and Pierson returned to the Silvebacks where he was a 2002 First Team All Star.  On July 24, 2002, the Silverbacks loaned Piesner to the MetroStars.  Piesner played a single minute in the MetroStars’ 3–1 victory over the Kansas City Wizards.  In September 2002, he played for the Dallas Burn in their penalty kick victory over C.D. Olimpia in the New Orleans Saints Pan-American Life Cup.

References

External links
 MetroStars: Brian Piesner
 Charleston Battery: Brian Piesner

Living people
1974 births
American soccer players
Atlanta Silverbacks players
Central Jersey Riptide players
Charleston Battery players
FC Dallas players
Major League Soccer players
New York Red Bulls players
Rutgers Scarlet Knights men's soccer players
Sportspeople from Harris County, Texas
USL League Two players
FC Dallas draft picks
People from Commack, New York
People from Spring, Texas
Association football midfielders